The 1999 Petit Le Mans was the second running of the Petit Le Mans and the sixth round of the 1999 American Le Mans Series season.  It took place at Road Atlanta, Georgia, on September 18, 1999.

Race results
Class winners in bold.

Statistics
 Pole Position - #1 Panoz Motor Sports - 1:10.873
 Fastest Lap - #42 BMW Motorsport - 1:12.653
 Distance - 
 Average Speed -

References

Petit Le Mans
Petit Le Mans